Walling is an unincorporated community in White County, Tennessee, United States. It lies along the Caney Fork southwest of Doyle, and east of Rock Island State Park. Tennessee State Route 136 passes through the community.  Walling has a post office with ZIP code 38587.

The community is likely named for a family of early settlers.

References

External links
 

Unincorporated communities in White County, Tennessee
Unincorporated communities in Tennessee